Derek Lance Holloway (born January 17, 1961) is a former wide receiver in the United States Football League, the National Football League, the Canadian Football League, the World League of American Football and the Arena Football League.

High school career
Holloway played high school football at Palmyra High School in Palmyra, New Jersey.  He led the state in scoring his senior year, 1978, scoring a record 188 points including 31 touchdowns and two extra points. That year, his team won the South Jersey Group I [small school] championship.

College career
Holloway played college football at the University of Arkansas. He set a variety of school records, including most receiving yards in a bowl game and longest scoring reception in a bowl game (both in the 1981 Gator Bowl). He led the Southwest Conference in kickoff returns in 1982.

Professional career

USFL
Holloway also played for the 1983 USFL Champion Michigan Panthers where he scored the first two touchdowns in the first ever Championship Game in Denver, Colorado.  He later played for the Oakland Invaders after the Panthers merged with them.

NFL
Holloway played in the NFL for the Washington Redskins and the Tampa Bay Buccaneers.

CFL
Holloway played for the Calgary Stampeders of the Canadian Football League in the 1988 season.

AFL
Holloway played with the Detroit Drive of the Arena Football League in 1992, helping the Drive with their 4th ArenaBowl Championship. He made a comeback in 1999 when he signed with the Buffalo Destroyers.

Sprinting
Holloway has also been highly ranked as a competitive sprinter. His career has extended from school days to masters athletics.

External links
AFL stats from arenafan.com

References

1961 births
Living people
People from Riverside Township, New Jersey
American football wide receivers
University of Arkansas alumni
Arkansas Razorbacks football players
Washington Redskins players
Tampa Bay Buccaneers players
American players of Canadian football
Canadian football wide receivers
Calgary Stampeders players
Sacramento Surge players
Detroit Drive players
Buffalo Destroyers players
Michigan Panthers players
Masters athletes
Oakland Invaders players